Tower Bridge is a Grade I listed combined bascule and suspension bridge in London, built between 1886 and 1894, designed by Horace Jones and engineered by John Wolfe Barry with the help of Henry Marc Brunel. It crosses the River Thames close to the Tower of London and is one of five London bridges owned and maintained by the Bridge House Estates, a charitable trust founded in 1282. The bridge was constructed to give better access to the East End of London, which had expanded its commercial potential in the 19th century. The bridge was opened by Edward, Prince of Wales and Alexandra, Princess of Wales in 1894.

Originally hydraulically powered, the operating mechanism was converted to an electro-hydraulic system in 1972. The bridge is part of the London Inner Ring Road and thus the boundary of the London congestion charge zone, and remains an important traffic route with 40,000 crossings every day. The bridge deck is freely accessible to both vehicles and pedestrians, whereas the bridge's twin towers, high-level walkways, and Victorian engine rooms form part of the Tower Bridge Exhibition.

Tower Bridge has become a recognisable London landmark.

History

Inception 

In the late 19th century, commercial development in the East End of London increased, leading to demand for a new river crossing downstream of London Bridge. A traditional fixed bridge at street level could not be built because it would cut off access by sailing ships to the port facilities in the Pool of London between London Bridge and the Tower of London.

A Special Bridge or Subway Committee chaired by Sir Albert Joseph Altman was formed in 1877 to find a solution. More than fifty designs were submitted, including one from civil engineer Sir Joseph Bazalgette, which was rejected because of a lack of sufficient headroom. A design was not approved until 1884 when it was decided to build a bascule bridge. Sir John Wolfe Barry was appointed engineer and Sir Horace Jones the architect (who was also one of the judges). An Act of Parliament authorising construction was passed in 1885. The design had to be in a Gothic style. Construction was funded by the Bridge House Estates, a charity established in 1282 for maintenance of London Bridge that subsequently expanded to cover Tower Bridge, Blackfriars Bridge, Southwark Bridge and the Millennium Bridge.

Barry designed a bridge with two bridge towers built on piers. The central span was split into two equal bascules or leaves, which could be raised to allow river traffic to pass. The two side spans were suspension bridges, with rods anchored both at the abutments and through rods contained in the bridge's upper walkways.

Construction 

Construction started in 1886, with the foundation stone laid by the Prince of Wales on 21 June, and took eight years. Major contractors included Sir John Jackson (foundations), Armstrong, Mitchell and Company (hydraulics), William Webster, and Sir William Arrol & Co. 432 people worked on the site; E W Crutwell was the resident engineer for the construction.

Jones died in 1887, and George D. Stevenson took over the project. Stevenson replaced Jones's original brick façade with the more ornate Victorian Gothic style, which made the bridge a distinctive landmark and was intended to harmonise the bridge with the nearby Tower of London. The total cost of construction was £1,184,000 (equivalent to £ in ).

Opening 

Tower Bridge was officially opened on 30 June 1894 by the Prince and Princess of Wales. The opening ceremony was attended by the Lord Chamberlain, the Lord Carrington and the Home Secretary, H. H. Asquith. An Act of Parliament stipulated that a tug boat should be on station to assist vessels in danger when crossing the bridge, a requirement that remained in place until the 1960s.

The bridge connected Iron Gate, on the north bank of the river, with  Lane, on the south – now known as Tower Bridge Approach and Tower Bridge Road, respectively. Until the bridge was opened, the Tower Subway –  to the west – was the shortest way to cross the river from Tower Hill to Tooley Street in Southwark. Opened in 1870, Tower Subway was among the world's earliest underground ("tube") railways, but it closed after just three months and was reopened as a tolled pedestrian foot tunnel. Once Tower Bridge was open, the majority of foot traffic transferred to using the bridge, as there was no toll to cross. Having lost most of its income, the tunnel was closed in 1898.

The high-level open-air walkways between the towers gained a reputation for prostitutes and pickpockets. Since they were only accessible by stairs, the walkways were seldom used by regular pedestrians and were closed in 1910. The walkway reopened in 1982 as part of the Tower Bridge Exhibition.

20th century 

During the Second World War, Tower Bridge was seen as a major transport link to the Port of London, and consequently was a target for enemy action. In 1940, the high-level span took a direct hit, severing the hydraulic mechanism and taking the bridge out of action. In April 1941, a parachute mine exploded close to the bridge, causing serious damage to the bascule, towers, and engine room. In 1942, a third engine was installed in case the existing ones were damaged by enemy action. It was a 150 hp horizontal cross-compound engine, built by Vickers Armstrong Ltd. at their Elswick works in Newcastle upon Tyne. It was fitted with a flywheel having a  diameter and weighing 9 tons, and was governed to a speed of 30 rpm. The engine became redundant when the rest of the system was modernised in 1974 and was donated to the Forncett Industrial Steam Museum by the City of London Corporation.

The southern section of the bridge, in the London Borough of Southwark, was Grade I listed on 6 December 1949. The remainder of the bridge, in the London Borough of Tower Hamlets, was listed on 27 September 1973. In 1974, the original operating mechanism was largely replaced by a new electro-hydraulic drive system, designed by BHA Cromwell House, with the original final pinions driven by modern hydraulic motors.

In 1982, the Tower Bridge Exhibition opened, housed in the bridge's twin towers, the long-closed high-level walkways, and the Victorian engine rooms. The latter still houses the original steam engines and some of the original hydraulic machinery.

21st century
The bridge closed for a month in 2000 to repair the bascules and perform other maintenance. A computer system was installed to control the raising and lowering of the bascules remotely. However, the system proved unreliable, resulting in the bridge being stuck in the open or closed positions on several occasions during 2005 until its sensors were replaced.

In April 2008, authorities announced that the bridge would undergo a £4 million refurbishment that would take four years to complete. The work entailed stripping existing paint down to bare metal and repainting in blue and white. Before this, the bridge's colour scheme dated from 1977, when it was painted red, white, and blue for Queen Elizabeth II's Silver Jubilee. Its colours were subsequently restored to blue and white. Each section was enshrouded in scaffolding and plastic sheeting to prevent the old paint falling into the Thames and causing pollution. Starting in mid-2008, contractors worked on a quarter of the bridge at a time to minimise disruption, but some road closures were inevitable. The completed work should stand for 25 years. The renovation of the walkway interior was completed in mid-2009. The renovation of the four suspension chains was completed in March 2010 using a state-of-the-art coating system requiring up to six different layers of paint. A lighting system based on RGB LED luminaires was installed, concealed within the bridge superstructure, and attached without drilling holes, owing to the bridge's Grade I listing.

The sound travelled backward and forwards along the walkway, echoing the structure of the bridge.

Following the Olympics, the rings were removed from Tower Bridge and replaced by the emblem of the Paralympic Games for the 2012 Summer Paralympics.

In 2016, Tower Bridge was closed to all road traffic from 1 October to 30 December. This was to allow structural maintenance work to take place on the timber decking, lifting mechanism and waterproofing the brick arches on the bridge's approaches. During this, the bridge was still open to waterborne traffic. It was open to pedestrians for all but three weekends when free ferry service was in operation.

Design

Structure 

The bascules, weighing over 1,000 tons each, are counterbalanced to minimise the force required and allow raising in five minutes.

One of the chimneys on the bridge connects to an old fireplace in a guardroom of the Tower of London. It is long-disused.

Hydraulic system

The original raising mechanism was powered by pressurised water stored in several hydraulic accumulators. The system was designed and installed by Hamilton Owen Rendel while working for Armstrong, Mitchell and Company of Newcastle upon Tyne. Each drove a force pump from its piston tail rod. The accumulators each comprise a  ram which sits a very heavy weight to maintain the desired pressure.

The entire hydraulic system along with the gas lighting system was installed by William Sugg & Co Ltd. The gas lighting was initially by open-flame burners within the lanterns, but was soon updated to the later incandescent system.

In 1974, the original operating mechanism was largely replaced by a new electro-hydraulic drive system, designed by BHA Cromwell House. The only remaining parts of the old system are the final pinions, which fit into the racks on the bascules and were driven by hydraulic motors and gearing. Oil is now used in place of water as the new hydraulic fluid.

Signalling and control 
Originally, river traffic passing beneath the bridge was required to follow several rules and signals. Daytime control was provided by red semaphore signals, mounted on small control cabins on either end of both of the bridge piers. At night, coloured lights were used, in either direction, on both of the piers: two red lights to show that the bridge was closed, and two green to show that it was open. In foggy weather, a gong was sounded as well.

Vessels passing through the bridge were required to display signals. By day, a black ball at least  in diameter was mounted high up where it could be seen. Night passage called for two red lights in the same position. Foggy weather required repeated blasts from the ship's steam whistle. If a black ball was suspended from the middle of each walkway (or a red light at night) this indicated that the bridge could not be opened.

Some of the control mechanism for the signalling equipment has been preserved and is housed in the Tower Bridge's museum.

Traffic

Road 
Tower Bridge is still a busy crossing of the Thames, used by more than 40,000 people (motorists, cyclists, and pedestrians) every day. The bridge is on the London Inner Ring Road, and is on the eastern boundary of the London congestion charge zone (drivers do not incur the charge by crossing the bridge).

To maintain the integrity of the structure, the City of London Corporation has imposed a  speed restriction, and an  weight limit on vehicles using the bridge. A camera system measures the speed of traffic crossing the bridge, using a number plate recognition system to send fixed penalty charges to speeding drivers.

A second system monitors other vehicle parameters. Induction loops and piezoelectric sensors are used to measure the weight, the height of the chassis above ground level, and the number of axles of each vehicle, with drivers of overweight vehicles also receiving fixed penalty notices.

Pedestrian

From the outset, the high-level connection was a pedestrian route and was intended to allow pedestrian movement to continue while the bridge was open. This was closed in 1910 due to growing crime in this hidden area but was reopened in 1982 when a glass floor was also installed.

River 
The bascules are raised about a thousand times a year. River traffic is now much reduced, but it still takes priority over road traffic. Today, 24 hours' notice is required before opening the bridge, and opening times are published in advance on the bridge's website; there is no charge for vessels to open the bridge.

Proximity to Underground 
The nearest London Underground tube stations to Tower Bridge are Tower Hill on the Circle and District lines, London Bridge on the Jubilee and Northern lines and Bermondsey on the Jubilee line, and the nearest Docklands Light Railway station is Tower Gateway. The nearest National Rail stations are at Fenchurch Street and London Bridge.

Cycling 
Transport for London have proposed Cycle Superhighway 4 to run across Tower Bridge.

Exhibition 

The Tower Bridge Exhibition is a display housed in the bridge's twin towers, the high-level walkways, and the Victorian engine rooms. It uses films, photos, and interactive displays to explain why and how Tower Bridge was built. Visitors can access the original steam engines that once powered the bridge bascules, housed in a building close to the south end of the bridge.

The exhibition charges an admission fee. The entrance is from the west side of the bridge deck to the northern tower, from where visitors ascend to level 4 by lift before crossing the high-level walkways to the southern tower. In the towers and walkways is an exhibition on the history of the bridge. The walkways also provide views over the city, the Tower of London and the Pool of London, and include a glass-floored section. From the south tower, visitors can visit the engine rooms, with the original steam engines, which are situated in a separate building beside the southern approach to the bridge.

Reaction 

Although Tower Bridge is an undoubted landmark, professional commentators in the early 20th century were critical of its aesthetics. "It represents the vice of tawdriness and pretentiousness, and of falsification of the actual facts of the structure", wrote Henry Heathcote Statham, while Frank Brangwyn stated that "A more absurd structure than the Tower Bridge was never thrown across a strategic river".

Benjamin Crisler, the New York Times film critic, wrote in 1938: "Three unique and valuable institutions the British have that we in America have not: Magna Carta, the Tower Bridge and Alfred Hitchcock." Architectural historian Dan Cruickshank selected Tower Bridge as one of his four choices for the 2002 BBC television documentary series Britain's Best Buildings. The bridge and its surrounding landscape was depicted in an official BBC trailer for the 2021 Rugby League World Cup (in reference to London being one of the host cities).

Tower Bridge has been mistaken for the next bridge upstream, London Bridge. A popular urban legend is that in 1968, Robert P. McCulloch, the purchaser of the old London Bridge that was later shipped to Lake Havasu City in Arizona, believed that he was buying Tower Bridge. This was denied by McCulloch himself and has been debunked by Ivan Luckin, the vendor of the bridge.

A partial replica of Tower Bridge has been built in the city of Suzhou in China. The replica differs from the original in having no lifting mechanism and four separate towers. The Suzhou replica was renovated in 2019, giving it a new look that differs from the original London design.

Incidents 
On 10 August 1912, the pioneering stunt pilot Francis McClean flew between the bascules and the high-level walkways in his Short Brothers S.33 floatplane. McClean became a celebrity overnight because of the stunt, and went on to fly underneath London Bridge, Blackfriars Bridge and Waterloo Bridge.

On 3 August 1922, a 13-year-old boy fell off a slipway next to the south side of Tower Bridge. A man jumped into the Thames to save him, but both were pulled under a barge by Butler's Wharf and drowned.

In December 1952, the bridge opened while a number 78 double-decker bus was crossing from the south bank. At that time, the gateman would ring a warning bell and close the gates when the bridge was clear before the watchman ordered the raising of the bridge. The process failed while a relief watchman was on duty. The bus was near the edge of the south bascule when it started to rise; driver Albert Gunter made a split-second decision to accelerate, clearing a  gap to drop  onto the north bascule, which had not yet started to rise. There were no serious injuries. Gunter was given £10 (equivalent to £ in ) by the City Corporation to honour his act of bravery.

On 5 April 1968, a Royal Air Force Hawker Hunter FGA.9 jet fighter from No. 1 Squadron made an unauthorised flight through Tower Bridge. Unimpressed that senior staff was not going to celebrate the RAF's 50th birthday with a flypast, the pilot flew at low altitude down the Thames without authorisation, past the Houses of Parliament, and continued towards the bridge. He flew beneath the walkway, at an estimated . He was placed under arrest upon landing, and discharged from the RAF on medical grounds without the chance to defend himself at a court martial.

On 31 July 1973, a single-engined Beagle Pup was twice flown under the pedestrian walkway of Tower Bridge by 29-year-old stockbroker's clerk Peter Martin. Martin, who was on bail following accusations of stock market fraud, then "buzzed" buildings in the city before flying north towards the Lake District, where he died when his aircraft crashed some two hours later.

In May 1997, the motorcade of United States President Bill Clinton was divided by the opening of the bridge. The Thames sailing barge Gladys, on her way to a gathering at St Katharine Docks, arrived on schedule and the bridge was opened for her. Returning from a Thames-side lunch at Le Pont de la Tour restaurant with UK Prime Minister Tony Blair, President Clinton was less punctual and arrived just as the bridge was rising. The bridge opening split the motorcade in two, much to the consternation of security staff. A spokesman for Tower Bridge is quoted as saying: "We tried to contact the American Embassy, but they wouldn't answer the phone."

On 19 August 1999, Jef Smith, a Freeman of the City of London, drove a flock of two sheep across the bridge. He was exercising a claimed ancient permission, granted as a right to freemen, to make a point about the powers of older citizens and the way their rights were being eroded.

Before dawn on 31 October 2003, a Fathers 4 Justice campaigner climbed a   tower crane near Tower Bridge at the start of a six-day protest dressed as Spider-Man. Fearing for his safety, and that of motorists should he fall, police cordoned off the area, closing the bridge and surrounding roads and causing widespread traffic congestion across the City and East London. 

On 11 May 2009, six people were trapped and injured after a lift fell  inside the north tower.

On 9 August 2021, the bridge remained open after a technical failure. The bridge had opened to let the Jubilee Trust Tall Ship through from 2 p.m. before getting stuck.  The bridge was closed and reopened to traffic approximately 12 hours later.

Gallery

See also 

 List of bridges in London
 Crossings of the River Thames
 Moveable bridges
 Pool of London

Historic places adjacent to Tower Bridge 
 HMS Belfast
 London Bridge
 Shad Thames
 St Katharine Docks
 Tower of London

References

Citations

Sources

Books

Journals

Television

External links 

 
 Bridge Lift Times
 Video showing the interior of a bascule chamber as the bridge lifts

Bascule bridges
Bridges across the River Thames
Bridges completed in 1894
Grade I listed bridges in London
Grade I listed buildings in the London Borough of Southwark
Grade I listed buildings in the London Borough of Tower Hamlets
Museums in the London Borough of Southwark
Museums in the London Borough of Tower Hamlets
Road bridges in England
Steam museums in London
Suspension bridges in the United Kingdom
Technology museums in the United Kingdom
Tower of London
Transport in the London Borough of Southwark
Transport in the London Borough of Tower Hamlets
Tourist attractions in London
Tourist attractions in the London Borough of Southwark
Tourist attractions in the London Borough of Tower Hamlets
Privately owned public spaces
Articles containing video clips
Bridges in London
1894 establishments in England
Bridge light displays